Andreas Laurentii Björnram (1520 – 1 January 1591), also known as Bothniensis, Bureus which he called himself in honor of his mother's family, was Archbishop of Uppsala in the Church of Sweden from 1583 to his death. He was born in 1520, being the last Archbishop of Uppsala to have been born before King Gustav Vasa decreed Lutheranism to be the official state religion of the Kingdom of Sweden in 1531 during the Lutheran Reformation.

Was one of the strongest supporters of King John III of Sweden's liturgy. Eventually he changed his mind, and as archbishop advocated the reading of Martin Luther's catechism.

He was married to Margareta, the daughter of Laurentius Petri, a main character in the Swedish reformation of 1531.

See also
List of Archbishops of Uppsala
Archbishop of Uppsala

References
Svenskt biografiskt handlexikon, article Björnram In Swedish
Svensk Familjebok (1905) In Swedish

1520 births
1593 deaths
Lutheran archbishops of Uppsala
16th-century Lutheran archbishops
16th-century Swedish people